Eyjafjallajökull, sometimes referred to by the numeronym E15, is one of the smaller ice caps of Iceland, north of Skógar and west of Mýrdalsjökull. The volcano has erupted relatively frequently since the Last Glacial Period, most recently in 2010, when, although relatively small for a volcanic eruption, it caused enormous disruption to air travel across northern and western Europe for a week.

Geography
Eyjafjallajökull consists of a volcano completely covered by an ice cap. The main outlet glaciers are to the north: Gígjökull , flowing into Lónið , and Steinholtsjökull , flowing into Steinholtslón . In 1967, there was a massive landslide on the Steinholtsjökull glacial tongue. On 16 January 1967 at 13:47:55 there was an explosion on the glacier. It can be timed because the seismometers at Kirkjubæjarklaustur monitored the movement.

The mountain itself, a stratovolcano, stands  at its highest point, and has a crater  in diameter, open to the north. The crater rim has three main peaks (clockwise from the north-east): Guðnasteinn , ; Hámundur , ; and Goðasteinn , . The former coastline now consists of sheer cliffs with many waterfalls, of which the best known is Skógafoss. In strong winds, the water of the smaller falls can even be blown up the mountain.

The Eyjafjallajökull volcano last erupted on 14 April 2010 in Iceland. It left behind vast ash clouds so large that in some areas daylight was entirely obscured. The cloud not only darkened the sky but also interfered with hundreds of plane flights. However, the people of Iceland were not concerned about the ash clouds: they were more concerned about flooding. That year all the residents close to the volcano had to evacuate in case the area flooded. When the volcano erupted, all the melted ice had to go somewhere. It did not flood that much: most of it went into rivers, but if it had flooded down the farm valleys it could have swept away all the farms in the valley. The farms in the valley were however covered in a soft layer of ash, which the farmers thought would give bad crops, but the warmth and nutrition from the ash enabled the crops to grow rather well.

Etymology

The name means "glacier of Eyjafjöll" (or more properly here "ice cap").  is the name of the southern side of the volcanic massif together with the small mountains which form the foot of the volcano. The word  , meaning glacier or ice cap, is a cognate with the Middle English word  surviving in the -icle of English icicle.

The name probably refers to the close by archipelago of Vestmannaeyjar.

A literal part-by-part translation of  would thus be "Islands' Mountains' glacier".

Geology 

The stratovolcano, whose vents follow an east–west trend, is composed of basalt to andesite lavas. Most of its historical eruptions have been explosive. However, fissure vents occur on both (mainly the west) sides of the volcano.

The volcano is fed by a magma chamber under the mountain, which in turn derives from the tectonic divergence of the Mid-Atlantic Ridge. It is part of a chain of volcanoes stretching across Iceland. Its nearest active neighbours are Katla, to the northeast, and Eldfell, on Heimaey, to the southwest.
The volcano is thought to be related to Katla geologically, in that eruptions of Eyjafjallajökull have generally been followed by eruptions of Katla.

Eyjafjallajökull erupted in the years 920, 1612, 1821, and 2010. The eruption in 920 was a radial fissure eruption while the subsequent 1612 and 1821 eruptions were small summit eruptions. In the case of the 1821 eruption, a short explosive phase in December of 1821 was followed by a year of intermittent explosive to effusive activity.

1821 to 1823 eruptions
Some damage was caused by a minor eruption in 1821. Notably, the ash released from the eruption contained a large fraction of fluoride, which in high doses may damage the bone structure of cattle, horses, sheep and humans. The eruption also caused some small and medium glacier runs and flooding in nearby rivers Markarfljót and Holtsá . The eruptive phase started on 19 and 20 December 1821 by a series of explosive eruptions and continued over the next several days. The sources describe heavy ash fall in the area around the volcano, especially to the south and west.

After that event the sequence of eruptions continued on a more subdued level until June 1822.

From the end of June until the beginning of August 1822, another sequence of explosive eruptions followed. The eruption columns were shot to considerable heights, with ashfall in both the far north of the country, in Eyjafjörður, and in the southwest, on the peninsula of Seltjarnarnes near Reykjavík.

The period from August to December 1822 seemed quieter, but farmers attributed the death of cattle and sheep in the Eyjafjörður area to poisoning from this eruption, which modern analysis identifies as fluoride poisoning. Some small glacier runs occurred in the river Holtsá. A bigger one flooded the plains near the river Markarfljót. (The sources do not indicate the exact date.).

In 1823, some men went hiking up on Eyjafjallajökull to inspect the craters. They discovered a fissure vent near the summit caldera a bit to the west of Guðnasteinn.

In early 1823, the nearby volcano Katla under the Mýrdalsjökull ice cap erupted and at the same time steam columns were seen on the summit of Eyjafjallajökull.

The ash of Eyjafjallajökull's 1821 eruptions is to be found all over the south of Iceland. It is dark grey in colour, small-grained and intermediate rock containing about 28–40% silicon dioxide.

2010 eruptions

On 26 February 2010, unusual seismic activity along with rapid expansion of the Earth's crust was registered by the Icelandic Meteorological Office. This gave geophysicists evidence that magma was pouring from underneath the crust into the magma chamber of the Eyjafjallajökull volcano and that pressure stemming from the process caused the huge crustal displacement at Þorvaldseyri  farm. The seismic activity continued to increase and from 3–5 March, close to 3,000 earthquakes were measured at the epicenter of the volcano.

This first eruption, in the form of a 300-meter-long radial fissure vent, did not occur under the glacier and was smaller in scale than had been expected by some geologists. The eruption consisted of 15 lava fountains reaching heights of up to 185 meters. The fissure opened on the north side of Fimmvörðuháls, directly across the popular hiking trail between Skógar, south of the pass, and Þórsmörk, immediately to the north.

On 14 April 2010 Eyjafjallajökull resumed erupting after a brief pause, this time from the top crater in the centre of the glacier, causing jökulhlaup (meltwater floods) to rush down the nearby rivers, and requiring 800 people to be evacuated. This eruption was explosive, due to meltwater getting into the volcanic vent. It was estimated to be ten to twenty times larger than the previous one in Fimmvörðuháls. This second eruption threw volcanic ash several kilometres up in the atmosphere, which led to air travel disruption in northwest Europe for six days from 15 to 21 April 2010. This disruption affected over 20 countries and as many as 10 million air travelers. The volcano erupted again in May 2010, causing the closure of airspace over many parts of Europe. The eruptions also created electrical storms. On 23 May 2010, the London Volcanic Ash Advisory Centre declared the eruption to have stopped, but stated that they were continuing to monitor the volcano. The volcano continued to have several earthquakes daily, with volcanologists watching the volcano closely. As of August 2010, Eyjafjallajökull was considered dormant. Infrasound sensors have been installed around Eyjafjallajökull to monitor for future eruptions.

In total, the 2010 eruptions generated about 0.27 cubic km (270 000 000 cubic metres) of tephra, causing ash fallout over central southern Iceland and parts of continental Europe. Nearby areas saw an ash layer of up to several centimeters, and surrounding glaciers saw a significant albedo reduction due to the ash.

Relationship to Katla

Each of the eruptions of Eyjafjallajökull in 920, 1612, and 1821–1823 has preceded an eruption of Katla. Katla did not display any unusual activity (such as expansion of the crust or seismic activity) during the 2010 eruptions of Eyjafjallajökull, though geologists have been concerned about the general instability of Katla since 1999. Some geophysicists in Iceland believe that the Eyjafjallajökull eruption may trigger an eruption of Katla, which would cause major flooding due to melting of glacial ice and send up massive plumes of ash. On 20 April 2010, Icelandic President Ólafur Grímsson said "the time for Katla to erupt is coming close...we [Iceland] have prepared...it is high time for European governments and airline authorities all over the world to start planning for the eventual Katla eruption".

Volcanologists continue to monitor Katla, aware that any eruption from Katla following an eruption from Eyjafjallajökull has historically occurred within months of an Eyjafjallajökull eruption. The Icelandic Meteorological Office updates its website with reports of quakes at both Eyjafjallajökull and Katla. On 8 July 2011 there was a jökulhlaup that destroyed a bridge on the Ring Road and caused cracks to appear on Katla's glacier.

Postage stamp 

Icelandic Post issued three special stamps in 2010 for the eruption of the Eyjafjallajökull volcano. All stamps contain real volcanic ash which fell on 17 April 2010.

Popular culture 
The volcano was featured in the 2013 movie, The Secret Life of Walter Mitty, where Walter had to flee from an eruption after pursuing photographer Sean O'Connell to Iceland.

It was mentioned in MF Doom's song "Guv'nor".

Emo band The World Is a Beautiful Place & I Am No Longer Afraid to Die released a song on their 2010 EP Formlessness called "Eyjafjallajokull Dance."

An Operator in the mobile game Arknights is named after it.

In the season 1 episode 8 of Sense8, Will wants to see "the volcano no one can pronounce the name of", and Riley responds with it.

If the corresponding DLC is owned, the volcano is a possible natural wonder that can spawn in Sid Meier's Civilization VI. On Steam, the game has a related achievement that references the ensuing aviation shutdown due to the 2010 eruptions.

See also 

 List of glaciers of Iceland
 List of waterfalls of Iceland
 Ragnar Th. Sigurdsson, who photographed the 2010 eruption
 Volcanism of Iceland
 2010 eruptions of Eyjafjallajökull

References

External links

 Eyjafjallajökull in the Catalogue of Icelandic Volcanoes

Photos 
 Satellite image of 2010 eruption by NASA
 A collection of satellite images from the CIMSS Satellite Blog
 Best of Photo Collection 
 More from Eyjafjallajökull – The Big Picture

Videos and webcams 
 Webcams of the eruption
 A short time-lapse from April 17, 2010. About 30 minutes played in 18 second.
 Video of the first 2010 eruption
 Video of the first 2010 eruption by Raw Iceland
 Video of the aftermath of Eyjafjallajokull eruption. Shot on July 28, 2010
 A film crew lands on Eyjafjallajokull during the 2010 eruption

Geological articles 
 
 Magma pathways and earthquakes at Eyjafjallajökull, Icelandic Meteorological Institute (PDF)
 SI / USGS Weekly Volcanic Activity Report for Eyjafjallajökull

Aviation ash forecasts 
 Volcanic Ash Advisory Graphical Forecast for the North Atlantic region

Maps 
 Contour map

 
Active volcanoes
Bodies of ice of Iceland
Ice caps
East Volcanic Zone of Iceland
Southern Region (Iceland)
Stratovolcanoes of Iceland
VEI-4 volcanoes
Subglacial volcanoes of Iceland
Volcanic systems of Iceland
Calderas of Iceland
Central volcanoes of Iceland